Cyril Hopkins (4 May 1882 – 25 September 1968) was a New Zealand cricketer. He played nine first-class matches for Otago between 1908 and 1913. His brother Bert played Test cricket for Australia.

In 1911-12 Hopkins became the first Otago batsman to score a century against Canterbury, though the annual first-class match between the two had been held since 1863–64. Opening the batting, he scored 132, exactly double the next-highest score in the match, but Canterbury won by three wickets.

See also
 List of Otago representative cricketers

References

External links
 

1882 births
1968 deaths
People from Yass
New Zealand cricketers
Otago cricketers